Cyperus holostigma is a species of sedge that is native to parts of eastern Africa.

See also 
 List of Cyperus species

References 

holostigma
Plants described in 1894
Flora of Kenya
Flora of Ethiopia
Flora of Eritrea
Taxa named by Charles Baron Clarke